John Gilbert Talbot  (24 February 1835 – 1 February 1910), was a British Conservative Party politician.

Background
Talbot was the son of the Honourable John Chetwynd-Talbot, the fourth son of Charles Chetwynd-Talbot, 2nd Earl Talbot. His mother was the Honourable Caroline Jane, daughter of James Stuart-Wortley-Mackenzie, 1st Baron Wharncliffe, grandson of Prime Minister John Stuart, 3rd Earl of Bute. The Right Reverend Edward Talbot, Bishop of Winchester, was his younger brother and Henry Chetwynd-Talbot, 18th Earl of Shrewsbury, his uncle.

Political career

Talbot entered Parliament at the 1868 general election for Kent West, a seat he held until 1878, when he resigned to fight a by-election in the Oxford University constituency.  He won the by-election, and held that seat until he stepped down at the January 1910 general election. He served under Benjamin Disraeli as Parliamentary Secretary to the Board of Trade from 1878 to 1880 and was sworn of the Privy Council in 1897.

Family

Talbot married the Honourable Meriel Sarah, daughter of George Lyttelton, 4th Baron Lyttelton, and sister of the Honourable Alfred Lyttelton, in 1860. They had four sons and six daughters. Their eldest son Sir George Talbot was a Judge of the High Court of Justice while their daughter Dame Meriel Talbot became a public servant and women's welfare worker. Talbot died in February 1910, aged 74. His wife survived him by fifteen years and died in April 1925.

See also
Earl Talbot
Earl of Shrewsbury

Notes

References

External links

 

1835 births
1910 deaths
Conservative Party (UK) MPs for English constituencies
Members of the Parliament of the United Kingdom for the University of Oxford
UK MPs 1868–1874
UK MPs 1874–1880
UK MPs 1880–1885
UK MPs 1885–1886
UK MPs 1886–1892
UK MPs 1892–1895
UK MPs 1895–1900
UK MPs 1900–1906
UK MPs 1906–1910
John Gilbert
Members of the Privy Council of the United Kingdom
Parliamentary Secretaries to the Board of Trade